Cassandra Kelly (born 29 June 1963) is a retired athlete from New Zealand. She represented her country in pole vault, heptathlon and hurdles in two Commonwealth Games.

In 1990, Kelly competed at the Commonwealth Games in Auckland, New Zealand, in the 100m hurdles and the heptathlon, in which she was placed ninth. In 1998, Kelly competed at the Commonwealth Games in Kuala Lumpur, Malaysia, in pole vault, finishing in seventh position. Kelly also competed at the Australian Track and Field Championships in 1990. In 1996 she held the New Zealand record for women's pole vaulting.

References

Living people
1963 births
Commonwealth Games competitors for New Zealand
Athletes (track and field) at the 1998 Commonwealth Games
Athletes (track and field) at the 1990 Commonwealth Games
New Zealand female pole vaulters
New Zealand heptathletes
New Zealand female hurdlers